Helge Orten (born 25 October 1966) is a Norwegian politician for the Conservative Party. He was elected to the Parliament of Norway from Møre og Romsdal in 2013 where he is a member of the Standing Committee on Transport and Communications.

References 

Conservative Party (Norway) politicians
Members of the Storting
Møre og Romsdal politicians
1966 births
Living people
21st-century Norwegian politicians